The swimming competition during the 2003 Summer Universiade, also known as the XXII Summer Universiade, took place in Daegu, South Korea from August 24 till August 30, 2003.



Men's events

Women's events

Medal table

References
 Schedule and results of swimming events at the XXII Summer Universiade
 SwimNews

Swimming at the Summer Universiade
Universiade
2003 Summer Universiade